Velia  was the Roman name of an ancient city of Magna Graecia on the coast of the Tyrrhenian Sea. It was founded by Greeks from Phocaea as Hyele around 538–535 BC. The name later changed to Ele and then Elea before it became known by its current Latin and Italian name during the Roman era. Its ruins are located in the Cilento region near the modern village Velia, which was named after the ancient city. The village is a frazione of the comune Ascea in the Province of Salerno, Campania, Italy.

The city was known for being the home of the philosophers Parmenides and Zeno of Elea, as well as the Eleatic school of which they were a part. The site of the acropolis of ancient Elea was once a promontory called Castello a Mare, meaning "castle on the sea" in Italian. It now lies inland and was renamed to Castellammare della Bruca in the Middle Ages.

Geography
The town is situated close to the Tyrrhenian coast in a hill zone nearby Marina di Casalvelino and Marina di Ascea, on a road linking Agropoli to the southern Cilentan Coast. Its population is mainly located in the plain by the sea (surrounding the southern part of the ancient ruins) and in the hill zones of Enotria, Bosco and Scifro. Velia also had a railway station on the Naples-Salerno-Reggio Calabria line, closed at the end of the 1970s.

History
According to Herodotus, in 545 BC Ionian Greeks fled Phocaea, in modern Turkey, which was being besieged by the Persians. After some wanderings (8 to 10 years) at sea, they stopped in Reggio Calabria, where they were probably joined by Xenophanes, who was at the time at Messina, and then moved north along the coast and founded the town of Hyele, later renamed Ele and then, eventually, Elea. The location is nearly at the same latitude as Phocaea.

Elea was not conquered by the Lucanians, but eventually joined Rome in 273 BC and was included in ancient Lucania. According to Book 6 of Virgil's Aeneid, Velia is the place where the body of Palinurus washed ashore.

Ruins
Remains of the city walls, with traces of one gate and several towers, of a total length of over three miles, still exist, and belong to three different periods, in all of which the crystalline limestone of the locality is used. Bricks were also employed in later times; their form is peculiar to this place, each having two rectangular channels on one side, and being about 1.5 inches square, with a thickness of nearly 4 inches They all bear Greek brick-stamps. There are some remains of cisterns on the site, and, various other traces of buildings.

In February 2022, archaeologists from the Velia excavation reported the discovery of two well-preserved bronze Greek helmets with Etruscan design, the remains of a painted brick wall and vases at the site of Velia. According to Italian Culture Minister Dario Franceschini, the excavation included metal fragments from weapons, vases with the Greek inscription for "sacred".

Eleatics

The Eleatics were a school of pre-Socratic philosophers. The group was founded in the early 5th century BC by Parmenides. Other members of the school included Zeno of Elea and Melissus of Samos. Xenophanes is sometimes included in the list, though there is some dispute over this.

Famous residents
The father of the Roman poet Publius Papinius Statius was born in Hyele (Silv 5.3.127).
Parmenides, philosopher and founder of the Eleatics
Zeno of Elea, Eleatic philosopher known for his paradoxes

Gallery

See also
List of ancient Greek cities

References

External links 

Official website 
Cilento National Park website 

Populated places established in the 6th century BC
Phocaean colonies
Ionian colonies in Magna Graecia
Roman towns and cities in Magna Grecia
World Heritage Sites in Italy
Frazioni of the Province of Salerno
Localities of Cilento
Former populated places in Italy
Greek colonies in Lucania
Archaeological sites in Campania
Ancient Greek archaeological sites in Italy
National museums of Italy